Sumter County Transit is the public transportation agency that serves Sumter County, Florida. Dial-a-ride service is the main component of the bureau's duty, which provides both local access and transportation to Gainesville. Two fixed routes also exist. The Orange Line makes two loops each weekday through the southern portion of the county between Center Hill and Sumterville. The Villages Shuttle provides various weekday loops through the expansive, upper-class community of mostly retirement villages.

External links
 Sumter County Transit (Sumter County Official Website)

Bus transportation in Florida
Transportation in Sumter County, Florida